Frederick W. Wells was a lawyer, public official, and civil rights organizer. While a law student at Columbia Law School in New York City in the 1920s, fellow students protested his living in a residence hall because he was African American, for which he received threats. Student organizers burned a cross outside his residence hall, drawing press coverage. The college stood by his right to live on campus but did not punish fellow law student organizers of the cross-burning and failed to act to address or take action to root out discrimination on its campus. The New York Public Library has a collection of papers including letters sent supporting him.

See also
Dunning School
George Edmund Haynes, sociologist who was the first African American to earn a doctorate degree from Columbia University

References

American civil rights lawyers

Year of birth missing
Columbia Law School alumni
Year of death missing